Māris Bičevskis (born August 3, 1991) is a Latvian professional ice hockey player for BK Mladá Boleslav of the Czech Extraliga (ELH). He is also a part of Latvia men's national ice hockey team.

In December 2011, made his debut with Dinamo Riga in official matches in Spengler Cup. On January 9, 2012 he made his KHL debut in a win against Dynamo Moscow.

Having left Dinamo Riga as a free agent, Bičevskis signed a two-year contract with Czech club, Mountfield HK of the ELH, from the 2018–19 season.

Career statistics

Regular season and playoffs

International

References

External links

1991 births
Living people
BK Mladá Boleslav players
Dinamo Riga players
Ice hockey people from Riga
Latvian ice hockey forwards
Stadion Hradec Králové players
HK Riga players
HK Liepājas Metalurgs players
Latvian expatriate ice hockey people
Latvian expatriate sportspeople in the Czech Republic
Expatriate ice hockey players in the Czech Republic